The 2009 Tajik League was the 18th season of Tajik League, the Tajikistan Football Federation's top division of association football. Regar-TadAZ were the defending champions, having won the previous season.

Teams

League table

Fixtures and results

Rounds 1–18

By match played

Season statistics

Top scorers

References

External links
 RSSSF 2009

Tajikistan Higher League seasons
1
Tajik
Tajik